Gadoni is a comune (municipality) in the Province of Nuoro in the Italian region Sardinia, located about  north of Cagliari and about  southwest of Nuoro.

The municipality of Gadoni contains the frazione (subdivision, a village or hamlet) of Funtana Raminosa.

Gadoni borders the following municipalities: Aritzo, Laconi, Seulo, Villanova Tulo.

Demographic evolution

References

Cities and towns in Sardinia